Kurkliai is a town in Anykščiai district municipality, in Utena County, in northeast Lithuania. According to the 2011 census, the town has a population of 374 people. Center of eldership. In town there is Anykščiai Regional Park.

History
The town had an important Jewish community before World War II. Jews of the town shared the fate of the Jews of Ukmerge and of the surroundings, who were massacred in a mass execution in the Pivonija forest on September 5, 1941. An old wooden synagogue is still standing.

Gallery

Education 
Kurkliai primary school

Famous citizens 
Arnoldas Lukošius (1966-), member of LT United and Foje.

References

Towns in Utena County
Towns in Lithuania
Vilkomirsky Uyezd
Holocaust locations in Lithuania
Anykščiai District Municipality